This article lists those who were potential candidates for the Republican nomination for Vice President of the United States in the 1960 election. After winning the Republican presidential nomination at the 1960 Republican National Convention, Vice President Richard Nixon needed to choose a running mate. President Dwight D. Eisenhower strongly supported UN Ambassador Henry Cabot Lodge Jr. Though Lodge lacked charisma as a campaigner, his foreign policy experience and stature as ambassador made him an appealing candidate. However, Lodge was unpopular with the Republican right, who did not want a Northeastern moderate on the ticket. Nixon also strongly considered conservative Minnesota Representative Walter Judd and moderate Kentucky Senator Thruston Morton. After a closed session with Republican Party leaders, Nixon announced his choice of Lodge. The Republican convention ratified Nixon's choice of Lodge. The Nixon–Lodge ticket lost the 1960 election to the Democratic ticket of Kennedy–Johnson.

Potential running mates

Finalists
Ambassador Henry Cabot Lodge Jr.
Kentucky Senator Thruston Morton
Minnesota Representative Walter Judd

Others
Secretary of the Treasury Robert B. Anderson
Illinois Senator Everett Dirksen
Michigan Representative Gerald Ford
Secretary of Labor James P. Mitchell
New York Governor Nelson Rockefeller
Pennsylvania Senator Hugh Scott
Secretary of Interior Fred A. Seaton
Indiana state representative Philip Willkie

Ford would eventually be chosen as Vice President by President Nixon in 1973 to replace Spiro Agnew and Ford would succeed to the presidency when Nixon resigned in 1974. Ford chose Nelson Rockefeller as his Vice President in 1974.

See also
1960 Republican National Convention
1960 Republican Party presidential primaries

References

Vice presidency of the United States
1960 United States presidential election
Richard Nixon
Nelson A. Rockefeller
Gerald Ford